Zaozernaya Hill is a hill that is located near the border between China, North Korea, and Russia. It is located west of Lake Khasan.

References

Hills of China
Hills of Russia
Landforms of North Korea